Altay is a breed of domesticated sheep originating in the dry, cold mountain basins of China.  This breed belongs to the fat-rumped carpet wool type of sheep and the Kazakh group.  Although the Altay grows wool, it is raised primarily for the meat.

Characteristics
At maturity, the rams average  and the ewes . The Altay's lambing percentage is approximately 103%. Both sexes are horned.

References

External links
Altay, Sheep101.info

Sheep breeds
Sheep breeds originating in China